Atmospheric pressure, also known as barometric pressure (after the barometer),    is the pressure within the atmosphere of Earth. The atm unit is roughly equivalent to the mean sea-level atmospheric pressure on Earth; that is, the Earth's atmospheric pressure at sea level is approximately 1 atm.

In most circumstances, atmospheric pressure is closely approximated by the hydrostatic pressure caused by the weight of air above the measurement point. As elevation increases, there is less overlying atmospheric mass, so atmospheric pressure decreases with increasing elevation. Because the atmosphere is thin relative to the Earth's radius—especially the dense atmospheric layer at low altitudes—the Earth's gravitational acceleration as a function of altitude can be approximated as constant and contributes little to this fall-off. Pressure measures force per unit area, with SI units of pascals (1 pascal = 1 newton per square metre, 1N/m2). On average, a column of air with a cross-sectional area of 1 square centimetre (cm2), measured from the mean (average) sea level to the top of Earth's atmosphere, has a mass of about 1.03 kilogram and exerts a force or "weight" of about 10.1 newtons, resulting in a pressure of 10.1 N/cm2 or 101kN/m2 (101 kilopascals, kPa). A column of air with a cross-sectional area of 1in2 would have a weight of about 14.7lbf, resulting in a pressure of 14.7lbf/in2.

Mechanism

Atmospheric pressure is caused by the gravitational attraction of the planet on the atmospheric gases above the surface and is a function of the mass of the planet, the radius of the surface, and the amount and composition of the gases and their vertical distribution in the atmosphere. It is modified by the planetary rotation and local effects such as wind velocity, density variations due to temperature and variations in composition.

Mean sea-level pressure 

The mean sea-level pressure (MSLP) is the atmospheric pressure at mean sea level (PMSL). This is the atmospheric pressure normally given in weather reports on radio, television, and newspapers or on the Internet. When barometers in the home are set to match the local weather reports, they display pressure adjusted to sea level, not the actual local atmospheric pressure.

The altimeter setting in aviation is an atmospheric pressure adjustment.

In aviation weather reports (METAR), QNH is transmitted around the world in hectopascals or millibars  (1 hectopascal = 1 millibar), except in the United States, Canada, and Japan where it is reported in inches of mercury (to two decimal places). The United States and Canada also report sea-level pressure SLP, which is adjusted to sea level by a different method, in the remarks section, not in the internationally transmitted part of the code, in hectopascals or millibars. However, in Canada's public weather reports, sea level pressure is instead reported in kilopascals.

In the US weather code remarks, three digits are all that are transmitted; decimal points and the one or two most significant digits are omitted:   is transmitted as 132;  is transmitted as 000; 998.7hPa is transmitted as 987; etc.

Surface pressure  

Surface pressure is the atmospheric pressure at a location on Earth's surface (terrain and oceans).  It is directly proportional to the mass of air over that location.

For numerical reasons, atmospheric models such as general circulation models (GCMs) usually predict the nondimensional logarithm of surface pressure.

The average value of surface pressure on Earth is 985 hPa. This is in contrast to mean sea-level pressure, which involves the extrapolation of pressure to sea level for locations above or below sea level. The average pressure at mean sea level (MSL) in the International Standard Atmosphere (ISA) is 1013.25 hPa, or 1 atmosphere (atm), or 29.92 inches of mercury.

Pressure (P), mass (m), and acceleration due to gravity (g) are related by P = F/A = (m*g)/A, where A is the surface area. Atmospheric pressure is thus proportional to the weight per unit area of the atmospheric mass above that location.

Altitude variation 

Pressure on Earth varies with the altitude of the surface, so air pressure on mountains is usually lower than air pressure at sea level. Pressure varies smoothly from the Earth's surface to the top of the mesosphere. Although the pressure changes with the weather, NASA has averaged the conditions for all parts of the earth year-round. As altitude increases, atmospheric pressure decreases. One can calculate the atmospheric pressure at a given altitude. Temperature and humidity also affect the atmospheric pressure. Pressure is proportional to temperature and inversely proportional to humidity. And it is necessary to know both of these to compute an accurate figure. The graph  was developed for a temperature of 15 °C and a relative humidity of 0%.

For higher altitudes within the troposphere, the following equation (the barometric formula) relates atmospheric pressure p to altitude h:

.  The values in these equations are:

Local variation 

Atmospheric pressure varies widely on Earth, and these changes are important in studying weather and climate. Atmospheric pressure shows a diurnal or semidiurnal (twice-daily) cycle caused by global atmospheric tides. This effect is strongest in tropical zones, with an amplitude of a few hectopascals, and almost zero in polar areas. These variations have two superimposed cycles, a circadian (24 h) cycle, and a semi-circadian (12 h) cycle.

Records 
The highest adjusted-to-sea level barometric pressure ever recorded on Earth (above 750 meters) was  measured in Tosontsengel, Mongolia on 19 December 2001. The discrimination is due to the problematic assumptions (assuming a standard lapse rate) associated with reduction of sea level from high elevations.

The lowest non-tornadic atmospheric pressure ever measured was 870 hPa (0.858  atm; 25.69 inHg), set on 12 October 1979, during Typhoon Tip in the western Pacific Ocean. The measurement was based on an instrumental observation made from a reconnaissance aircraft.

Measurement based on the depth of water 
Thus, a diver 10.3 m underwater experiences a pressure of about 2 atmospheres (1 atm of air plus 1 atm of water). Conversely, 10.3 m is the maximum height to which water can be raised using suction under standard atmospheric conditions.

Low pressures, such as natural gas lines, are sometimes specified in inches of water, typically written as w.c. (water column) gauge or w.g. (inches water) gauge. Similar metric units with a wide variety of names and notation based on millimetres, centimetres or metres are now less commonly used.

Boiling point of liquids 

The boiling point is the temperature at which the vapour pressure is equal to the atmospheric pressure around the liquid. Because of this, the boiling point of liquids is lower at lower pressure and higher at higher pressure. Cooking at high elevations, therefore, requires adjustments to recipes or pressure cooking. A rough approximation of elevation can be obtained by measuring the temperature at which water boils; in the mid-19th century, this method was used by explorers. Conversely, if one wishes to evaporate a liquid at a lower temperature, for example in distillation, the atmospheric pressure may be lowered by using a vacuum pump, as in a rotary evaporator.

Measurement and maps 
An important application of the knowledge that atmospheric pressure varies directly with altitude was in determining the height of hills and mountains, thanks to reliable pressure measurement devices. In 1774, Maskelyne was confirming Newton's theory of gravitation at and on Schiehallion mountain in Scotland, and he needed to measure elevations on the mountain's sides accurately.  William Roy, using barometric pressure, was able to confirm Maskelyne's height determinations, the agreement being to be within one meter (3.28 feet). This method became and continues to be useful for survey work and map making.

See also 

 
 
 
  – physical damage to body tissues caused by a difference in pressure between an air space inside or beside the body and the surrounding gas or liquid.
 
 
 Collapsing can – an aluminium can is crushed by the atmospheric pressure surrounding it
 
 
 , a tabulation of typical variations of principal thermodynamic variables of the atmosphere (pressure, density, temperature, etc.) with altitude, at middle latitudes.
 
 
 , an empirical, global reference atmospheric model of the Earth from ground to space

References

External links 
1976 Standard Atmosphere from NASA
Source code and equations for the 1976 Standard Atmosphere
A mathematical model of the 1976 U.S. Standard Atmosphere
Calculator using multiple units and properties for the 1976 Standard Atmosphere
Calculator giving standard air pressure at a specified altitude, or altitude at which a pressure would be standard
Current map of global mean sea-level pressure
Calculate pressure from altitude and vice versa

Experiments 
Movies on atmospheric pressure experiments from Georgia State University's HyperPhysics website – requires QuickTime
Test showing a can being crushed after boiling water inside it, then moving it into a tub of ice-cold water.

Atmosphere
Atmospheric thermodynamics
Pressure
Underwater diving physics